The Record of School Achievement (RoSA) is an Australian qualification issued by the New South Wales Education Standards Authority in New South Wales. It is provided to students who complete Year 10 but who leave school before achieving the Higher School Certificate.

Features of the Record of School Achievement include:
a list of courses undertaken in Years 10, 11 and 12
statewide grades (A–E) achieved at the end of Years 10 and 11
results in optional tests of literacy and numeracy
a record of extra-curricular achievements

The RoSA replaces the School Certificate, which was awarded for the last time in 2011.

See also
 Education in Australia
 University admission
 Victorian Certificate of Education
 South Australian Certificate of Education
 Tasmanian Certificate of Education
 Western Australian Certificate of Education
 ACT Scaling Test
 Queensland Certificate of Education
 Overall Position (Queensland)
 Bored of Studies

References

Education in New South Wales
School qualifications